Dichotomocladium is a genus of fungi belonging to the family Syncephalastraceae.

Species:

Dichotomocladium elegans 
Dichotomocladium floridanum 
Dichotomocladium hesseltinei 
Dichotomocladium robustum 
Dichotomocladium sphaerosporum

References

Fungi